"Hard to Be Cool" is a song recorded by American country music artist Joe Nichols. It was released in September 2014 as his third single for Red Bow Records and from his eighth studio album Crickets.  The song was written by Jason Sellers and Rob Hatch.

Critical reception
Wes Langeler of Whiskey Riff gave the song 7 stars out of 10, praising its guitar work and calling it "radio friendly".

Chart performance

Year-end charts

References

2013 songs
2014 singles
Joe Nichols songs
Songs written by Rob Hatch
Songs written by Jason Sellers
BBR Music Group singles